Cleopatra 2525 is an American science fiction television series that aired in syndication for two seasons, from January 2000 to March 2001. Produced by Renaissance Pictures and distributed by Studios USA, many stations aired it as part of the Back2Back Action Hour, along with Jack of All Trades.

Plot

When complications arise during her breast augmentation surgery, 20th-century exotic dancer Cleo (Jennifer Sky) is put into suspended animation. Waking 525 years in the future, Cleo joins two women in their fight against the Baileys, armed flying machines that now control Earth's surface. Her team leader, Hel (Gina Torres), is commanded by a mysterious female entity called "Voice", who relays orders via a communications implant under Hel's right ear. Voice controls many other teams and gives them their orders in a similar fashion, in effect, forming a resistance to the Baileys, with their ultimate goal to retake the Earth's surface. Their final team member is Sarge (Victoria Pratt), whose sister belongs to a cult that regards the Baileys with reverence and willingly sacrifices themselves to them.

Humanity has moved underground and built a complex of elaborate shafts and tunnels, created by the "shaft builders" to survive the Bailey menace. Cleo wows the 26th-century denizens with her philosophical sayings, many of which come from 20th-century popular culture.

Cast 
 Jennifer Sky as Cleo, Cleopatra
 Gina Torres as Hel, Helen
 Victoria Pratt as Sarge, Rose
 Patrick Kake as Mauser
 Elizabeth Hawthorne as The Voice
 Danielle Cormack as Raina
 Joel Tobeck as Creegan
 Stacey Edgar as Lara
 Stephen Lovatt as Schrager
 Mark Ferguson as Confessor
 Colin Moy as Quint
 Paolo Rotondo as Porter

Production
The series' theme song is based on Zager and Evans' 1969 hit "In the Year 2525 (Exordium and Terminus)", albeit with altered lyrics.

Episodes

Season 1 (2000)

Season 2 (2000–01)

Reception
Don Houston of DVD Talk describes the show as fun, with interesting elements and themes, and a kind of sly sense of camp so often missing in syndicated television shows. He said the DVD release gave good value for money, and that the show was, despite its limitations, "a worthwhile bit of entertainment".

Home media
The series was released on Region 1 DVD by Universal Pictures Home Entertainment in the United States on July 19, 2005.

References

External links
 Official Website
 

2000 American television series debuts
2001 American television series endings
2000s American science fiction television series
Action Pack (TV programming block)
English-language television shows
Post-apocalyptic television series
Television series by Universal Television
Television series about robots
Television shows filmed in New Zealand
Television series set in the future
Television series set in the 26th century